Gausganj is a census village in the southeast of the Hardoi district in the state of Uttar Pradesh, India.  Situated south of Kachhauna, it is located midway between Mallawan and Sandila on the state highway that links them.

References

Villages in Hardoi district